The Tichborne Claimant  is a 1998 British dramatic film directed by David Yates and starring Robert Pugh, Stephen Fry, and Robert Hardy. The film is based on the Tichborne case, a historical case of identity theft. In 1854, Roger Tichborne, then-heir to the Tichborne Baronetcy disappeared while traveling in South America. He was thought likely to have set sail with the ship Bella, which was shipwrecked off the coast of the Empire of Brazil, with no known survivors. In 1865, Thomas Castro (an Australian butcher), started claiming to be the missing heir. The dispute over his identity lasted to his death in 1898, and he is mostly known as "the Claimant". While Castro is currently considered an impostor, doubts considering his real identity have persisted to the present.

Plot
Based on the Tichborne case, the film is set in the late 19th century. The film concerns a claimant to the Tichborne Baronetcy.

Lord Tichborne, the ninth-richest nobleman in England, disappears after a South American shipwreck. Some years later his erudite Afro-English valet, Bogle, is sent to investigate rumors that Tichborne survived and settled in Australia. An alcoholic ruffian answers Bogle's inquiries, claiming to be the lost heir. Bogle suspects fraud, but conspires with the claimant to split the inheritance should the latter successfully pass himself off to friends, family and the courts. As the claimant returns to England to continue his charade, enough people confirm his identity to make both the claimant and Bogle believe that he just might be the rightful heir after all.

Cast
Robert Pugh as The Claimant
John Kani as Bogle
Stephen Fry as Hawkins
John Gielgud as Cockburn
Robert Hardy as Lord Rivers
Charles Gray as Arundell
James Villiers as Uncle Henry 
Dudley Sutton as Onslow
 Perry Fenwick as John Holmes
 Christopher Benjamin as Gibbes 
 Roger Hammond as Cubitt 
 John Challis as Rous the Landlord
 Anita Dobson as Fanny Loder 
 Ursula Howells as Lady Doughty 
 Jennifer Hennessy as Cousin Alicia

External links

1998 films
Drama films based on actual events
Films about identity theft
Films directed by David Yates
Films scored by Nicholas Hooper
Films set in the 19th century
Films set in England
Films about hoaxes
1990s historical drama films
British historical drama films
1998 directorial debut films
1998 drama films
1999 drama films
1999 films
1990s English-language films
1990s British films